Michael Edward "Peter" Kennedy III (born September 4, 1927) is an American retired pair skater. Although named Michael, he was nicknamed Peter as a child, and has been credited in competition by both names. With his sister, Karol, he won five U.S. Championship titles from 1948–1952. Known as "The Kennedy Kids," they won the World Championship in 1950, and the silver medal in the 1952 Winter Olympics. He was born in Olympia, Washington.

Competitive highlights
(all with Karol)

References
 
 GoldenSkate: North American Figure Skating Championships: List of Champions
 Skatabase: 1948 Winter Olympics: Pairs Results
 Skatabase: 1952 Winter Olympics: Pairs Results
 Skatabase: 1940s Worlds: Pairs Results
 Skatabase: 1950s Worlds: Pairs Results

1927 births
Living people
American male pair skaters
Figure skaters at the 1948 Winter Olympics
Figure skaters at the 1952 Winter Olympics
Olympic silver medalists for the United States in figure skating
Sportspeople from Olympia, Washington
Olympic medalists in figure skating
World Figure Skating Championships medalists
Medalists at the 1952 Winter Olympics
20th-century American people
21st-century American people